This is a list of major bridges in Melbourne, Victoria, Australia:

Bolte Bridge
Charles Grimes Bridge
Church Street Bridge
Cremorne Railway Bridge
Darebin Creek Bridge
 Evan Walker pedestrian bridge, completed in 1992.
Flinders Street Viaduct
Hawthorn Bridge
Hawthorn Railway Bridge
Hoddle Bridge
Jim Stynes Bridge pedestrian bridge
King Street Bridge
MacRobertson Bridge
Maribyrnong River Viaduct
Morell Bridge
Princes Bridge
Queens Bridge
Sandridge Bridge
Seafarers Bridge
Spencer Street Bridge
Swan Street Bridge
Victoria Bridge
West Gate Bridge

See also 
List of bridges in Australia

Bridges
Melbourne bridges
Melbourne
Lists of buildings and structures in Victoria (Australia)